I'm Glad My Mother Is Alive is a 2009 French film directed by Claude Miller and Nathan Miller.

Plot
Thomas, an adopted teenager and uncomfortable, goes in search of his past to understand why his mother abandoned him and his brother when he was 4 years old. He searches for his mother without telling either his brother or his adoptive parents. He then discovers that she is no longer with her biological father, that she had a third son with another man, and that she now lives alone with her other son.

Cast 

 Vincent Rottiers as Thomas Jouvet 
 Sophie Cattani as Julie Martino 
 Christine Citti as Annie Jouvet 
 Yves Verhoeven as Yves Jouvet 
 Olivier Guéritée as Patrick / François
 Gabin Lefebvre as Tommy
 Quentin Gonzalez as Frédéric
 Chantal Banlier as Chantal Duronnet
 Thomas Momplot as Mathieu
 Samir Guesmi as The employer
 Sabrina Ouazani as The cinema cashier
 Carole Franck as The orphanage's director

Production
The movie was presented in several festival like the Montreal World Film Festival, the Venice Film Festival, the Festival do Rio, the São Paulo International Film Festival and the San Francisco International Film Festival.

Critical reception
The film was well received by the critics. Review aggregator Rotten Tomatoes reports that 92% of 13 critics gave the film a positive review, for an average rating of 7.4/10.

Accolades

References

External links 

2009 films
2009 drama films
2000s French-language films
French drama films
Belgian drama films
Films directed by Claude Miller
2000s French films